David Chalmers Pickeman (8 May 1893 – June 1945) was an Irish first-class cricketer.

Pickeman was born at Dublin in May 1893 to William and Janet Pickeman, Scottish immigrants to Ireland. His father was responsible for laying out the course at Portmarnock Golf Club. He served in World War I with the British Army, reaching the rank of Corporal in the Royal Engineers. Following the war, he returned to Ireland and began to play club cricket for Pembroke and occasionally Leinster. He made his debut for Ireland in a minor match against Wales at Cardiff. He made one appearance in first-class cricket for Ireland against Scotland at Glenpark in 1926. Batting twice in the match, Pickeman was dismissed for 2 runs by Gilbert Hole in Ireland's first-innings, while in their second-innings he was dismissed without scoring by Alexander Forrester. He continued to play club cricket in Dublin until 1931. Outside of cricket, he worked as a chemist. He died at Dublin in June 1945.

References

External links

1893 births
1945 deaths
Irish cricketers
British Army personnel of World War I
Royal Engineers soldiers
Irish people of Scottish descent
Cricketers from Dublin (city)
People from Donnybrook, Dublin